In Greek mythology, Daetor (Ancient Greek: Δαίτωρ) one of the Trojan warriors who attacked the Greek fleet during the tenth year of the Trojan War. He was shot dead by an arrow from Teucer, half-brother of Telamonian Ajax.

Note

References 
 Homer, The Iliad with an English Translation by A.T. Murray, Ph.D. in two volumes. Cambridge, MA., Harvard University Press; London, William Heinemann, Ltd. 1924. . Online version at the Perseus Digital Library.
 Homer, Homeri Opera in five volumes. Oxford, Oxford University Press. 1920. . Greek text available at the Perseus Digital Library.

Trojans